The Fly Products Power is a family of Italian paramotors that was designed and produced by Fly Products of Grottammare for powered paragliding.

Design and development
The aircraft line features a paraglider-style high-wing, single-place or two-place-in-tandem accommodation and a single engine in pusher configuration. As is the case with all paramotors, take-off and landing is accomplished by foot.

The Power line all use the same seat harness and frame assembly. Most models also use the Solo 210 engine, combining it with different diameter propellers and protection cages to create higher thrust models. The model numbers correspond to the propeller diameter in centimetres and also indicate the maximum pilot weight in kilograms. The Power 70 model uses direct drive, but the 95, 115 and 30 models all use a reduction drive. These can be converted from one model to another more powerful one by mounting a larger propeller and protection cage to accommodate heavier pilot weights.

A one or two-seat tricycle wheeled carriage called the Trike Delta was also manufactured by the company. This unit mounts the power unit to convert the paramotor into a powered parachute.

Original factory options available for the Power line included electric starting,  fuel tank, high performance exhaust system and a harness with quick release buckles and storage pockets.

Variants
Power 70
Single seat version, with a direct drive  Solo 210 engine,  diameter propeller and maximum pilot weight of 
Power 95
Single seat version, with a 2.5:1 reduction drive  Solo 210 engine,  diameter propeller and maximum pilot weight of 
Power 115
Single seat version, with a 2.5:1 reduction drive  Solo 210 engine,  diameter propeller and maximum pilot weight of 
Power 130
Single seat version, with a 2.5:1 reduction drive  Solo 210 engine,  diameter propeller and maximum pilot weight of 
Power Plus
Single or two-seats-in tandem version, with a 2.2:1 reduction drive  Zanzottera MZ 34 engine,  diameter propeller and maximum pilot weight of 
Power Jet
Single seat version, with a 4:1 reduction drive  Per Il Volo Top 80 engine
Power Sky
Single seat version, with a 4:1 reduction drive  Sky engine

Specifications (Power 70)

References

1990s Italian ultralight aircraft
Single-engined pusher aircraft
Paramotors